was a brother of the famous Mōri Motonari and son of Mōri Hiromoto.

See also
Mōri clan
Mōri Motonari

References

Date of birth unknown
1557 deaths
16th-century Japanese people
Mōri clan